Nogometni Klub Mramor, commonly referred to as NK Mramor or simply Mramor, is a Bosnian football club from the settlement of Mramor near Tuzla, which currently plays in the Second League FBiH.

External links
NK Mramor Facebook 
NK Mramor Profile at Posavina Canton FA's website 

NK Mramor
Football clubs in Bosnia and Herzegovina
Sport in Tuzla
NK Mramor